The 2017 Challenge Cup, (also known as the Ladbrokes Challenge Cup for sponsorship reasons) was the 116th staging of the Challenge Cup the main rugby league knockout tournament for teams in the Super League, the British National Leagues and a number of invited amateur clubs.

The defending champions were Hull F.C. who beat Warrington Wolves 12–10 in the 2016 final at Wembley Stadium.  Hull F.C. retained the trophy beating Wigan Warriors 18–14 at Wembley on 26 August 2017.

The format of the competition was eight knock-out rounds followed by a final. The first two rounds were composed entirely of 32 amateur teams. The eight winners of the second round ties were joined in round 3 by the 16 League 1 teams including for the first time a Canadian team, the Toronto Wolfpack. For the fourth round the 12 Championship teams were included in the draw. Round 5 saw four Super League teams entering the competition. These are the four teams that finished in the top four positions of the 2016 Qualifiers and are Huddersfield Giants, Leeds Rhinos, Leigh Centurions and Salford Red Devils. The remaining eight Super League teams joined in round 6.

Round dates

First round
The draw for the first round of the 2017 Challenge Cup was held on 5 January 2017 at the Deep to celebrate the city being named 2017 UK City of Culture and Hull's efforts in 2016 and featured 32 amateur teams from around the United Kingdom including one student team, all three armed services and the police. Home teams were drawn by Lee Radford and the away teams drawn by Dean Andrew, President of the RFL and The RAF.

Fixtures for the first round were played over the weekend of the 28–29 January 2017.

Second round
The second round draw was made on 31 January from the home of amateur team Siddal, who qualified for the second round by defeating Milford Martins 16–14, and was streamed live on BBC Sport's website. The draw was made by former players, Johnny Lawless and Luke Robinson both of whom played for Siddal before turning professional.  Ties were played over the weekend of 11–12 February 2017 with the exception of the game between West Hull and Thatto Heath which was postponed for a week due to a waterlogged pitch.

Third round
The draw for the third round as made on 14 February 2017. The draw was conducted by Super League players Stefan Ratchford and Ryan Brierley.  Ties were played 25–26 February 2017.

Fourth round

The winners of the 12 third-round ties were joined in the fourth round by the 12 teams in the Championship. The draw was made on board HMS Bulwark on Tuesday 28 February. The draw was made by former St Helens player, Paul Sculthorpe and the chairman of the Royal Marine Rugby League Association, Major Jack Duckitt.  Ties were played over the weekend of 17–19 March with the exception of the Whitehaven v Oxford fixture which was postponed due to a waterlogged pitch.

Fifth round
The fifth round draw sees the entry of four Super League clubs, these being those that finished the top of the 2016 Qualifiers. The draw was made live on the BBC Radio 5 Live breakfast show on Tuesday 21 March at 7-45 am. The draw was made by show host, Rachel Burden, and former international player, at both codes, Jason Robinson.

Sixth round
The draw for the sixth round was made on Tuesday 25 April live on the BBC News channel during the 6-30pm Sportsday programme. The draw was made by former players Chris Joynt and Keith Senior.

Quarter-finals
The draw for the quarter finals was made immediately after the conclusion of the last sixth round match. Home teams were drawn by former Welsh international Iestyn Harris and away teams by Leigh captain Micky Higham.

Semi-final
The semi-final draw was conducted on BBC 2 immediately after Hull's 32–24 victory over Castleford Tigers. Conducting the draw were two Challenge Cup winning team members; Danny Brough (2005) and  Barry Johnson (1986).  The ties were played at neutral venues; after the draw these were announced as Doncaster and Warrington.

Final

Teams:

Hull: Jamie Shaul, Mahe Fonua, Josh Griffin, Carlos Tuimavave, Fetuli Talanoa, Albert Kelly, Marc Sneyd, Liam Watts, Danny Houghton, Scott Taylor, Sika Manu, Mark Minichiello, Gareth Ellis (captain).

Substitutes (all used): Chris Green, Danny Washbrook, Josh Bowden, Jake Connor.
Tries: Talanoa (1), Fonua (2). Goals: Sneyd (3/3).

Wigan Warriors: Sam Tomkins, Liam Marshall, Anthony Gelling, Oliver Gildart, Joe Burgess, George Williams, Thomas Leuluai, Frank Paul Nuuausala, Michael McIlorum, Tony Clubb, John Bateman, Liam Farrell, Sean O'Loughlin (captain).

Substitutes (all used): Willie Isa, Ryan Sutton, Sam Powell, Taulima Tautai.
Tries: Bateman (1), Gildart (1), Burgess (1). Goals: Williams (1/3).

Lance Todd Trophy Winner: Marc Sneyd

Broadcasts
The primary broadcast organisation for the competition was BBC Sport. On 24 January the RFL announced that the BBC would be streaming one tie from each of the first five rounds live on the BBC Sport website with two games from the 6th, 7th and 8th rounds being broadcast live on BBC TV.  The fifth-round game between Salford and Toronto was streamed live on Facebook (excluding the United Kingdom and Ireland) after the RFL and both clubs agreed a deal over global broadcast rights.

Sky Sports also have broadcasting rights after the fifth round and showed two games from the sixth round live.

Live matches

References

Explanatory notes

Notes

External links

Challenge Cup
Challenge Cup
Challenge Cup
Challenge Cup
Challenge Cup
Challenge Cup